Zonked!, known in Europe as Ain't it Fun?, is the third studio album by Dee Dee Ramone, released in October 1997 by Other Peoples Music. The album features contributions from former Ramones members Joey and Marky Ramone, guitarist and producer Daniel Rey, and Cramps lead singer Lux Interior. The European edition of the album contains the bonus track "Please Kill Me".

Track listing

Personnel
Dee Dee Ramone – vocals, guitar
Barbara Ramone – bass, lead vocals on "Never Never Again", "Get Out of My Room" and "My Chico"  
Daniel Rey – guitar, backing vocals
Marky Ramone – drums

Additional musicians

Joey Ramone – lead vocals on "I Am Seeing UFOs"
Lux Interior – lead vocals on "Bad Horoscope"
Peter Arsenault – backing vocals on "Disguises"
Dave Thomas – drums on "Please Kill Me"
Tim Sullivan – Farfisa organ on "Please Kill Me"

Technical

Daniel Rey – producer
Hillary Johnson – engineer
Mixed at Baby Monster Studio, New York City
Ian Bryan – mixing engineer
Howie Weinberg – mastering
"Please Kill Me" recorded at Brass Giraffe Studio, New York City
Craig Randal – engineer 
Rich Tapper – assistant engineer

References

External links 

 Zonked! on Discogs.com. Retrieved on 7 December 2018.

Dee Dee Ramone albums
1997 albums